Marriage law is the legal requirements that determine the validity of a marriage, and which vary considerably among countries. See also Marriage Act.

Summary table

Rights and obligations 

A marriage, by definition, bestows rights and obligations on the married parties, and sometimes on relatives as well, being the sole mechanism for the creation of affinal ties (in-laws). Over 2.3 million weddings take place in the U.S each year. Historically, many societies have given sets of rights and obligations to husbands that have been very different from the sets of rights and obligations given to wives. In particular, the control of marital property, inheritance rights, and the right to dictate the activities of children of the marriage have typically been given to male marital partners (for more details see coverture and marital power). However, these practices were curtailed to a great deal in many countries, especially Western countries, in the twentieth century, and more modern statutes tend to define the rights and duties of a spouse without reference to gender. In various marriage laws around the world, however, the husband continues to have authority; for instance, the Civil Code of Iran states at Article 1105: "In relations between husband and wife; the position of the head of the family is the exclusive right of the husband".

These rights and obligations vary considerably among legal systems, societies, and groups within a society, and may include:

 Giving a husband/wife or his/her family control over some portion of a spouse's labor or property.
 Giving a husband/wife responsibility for some portion of a spouse's debts.
 Giving a husband/wife visitation rights when his/her spouse is incarcerated or hospitalized.
 Giving a husband/wife control over his/her spouse's affairs when the spouse is incapacitated.
 Establishing the second legal guardian of a parent's child.
 Establishing a joint fund of property for the benefit of children.
 Establishing a relationship between the families of the spouses.

Common law marriage 

In medieval Europe, marriage came under the jurisdiction of common law, which recognized as a valid marriage one where the parties stated that they took one another as wife and husband, even in absence of any witnesses.

The Catholic Church forbade clandestine marriage at the Fourth Lateran Council (1215), which required all marriages to be announced in a church by a priest. The Council of Trent (1545–1563) introduced more specific requirements, ruling that future marriages would be valid only if witnessed by the pastor of the parish or the local ordinary (the bishop of the diocese) or by the delegate of one of said witnesses, the marriage being invalid otherwise, even if witnessed by a Catholic priest.This ruling was not accepted in the newly Protestant nations of Europe, nor by Protestants who lived in Roman Catholic countries or their colonies, nor by Eastern Orthodox Christians.

It is sometimes mistakenly claimed that before the Marriage Act 1753 cohabiting couples would enjoy the protection of a "common-law marriage". In fact, neither the name nor the concept of "common-law marriage" was known at this time. Far from being treated as if they were married, couples known to be cohabiting risked prosecution by the church courts for fornication.

The Marriage Act 1753 also did not apply to Britain's overseas colonies of the time, so common-law marriages continued to be recognized in the what became the United States and Canada. Although it is claimed that common-law marriage in the US originated in English common-law, this institution in the United States appears to have originated in the primitive conditions of colonial America where the presence of relatively few clerics or civil officials necessitated a substitute for ceremonial marriage, and the need expanded as the settlers moved into the sparsely populated regions of the West. In the United States, common-law marriages are still recognized in Alabama, Colorado, Iowa, Kansas, Montana, Rhode Island, South Carolina, Texas, Utah and the District of Columbia, (see Common-law marriage in the United States).

All countries in Europe have now abolished "marriage by habit and repute", with Scotland being the last to do so in 2006.

Australia has recognised de facto relationships since the Family Law Act of 2009.

Marriage restrictions 

Marriage is an institution that is historically filled with restrictions. From age, to gender, to social status, various restrictions are placed on marriage by communities, religious institutions, legal traditions and states.

Marriage age 

The minimum age at which a person is able to lawfully marry, and whether parental or other consents are required, vary from country to country. In the U.S the minimum age for marriage without parental and/or judicial approval is 18 except for Nebraska (19) and Mississippi (21); but most states allow exceptions to the general minimum age in some circumstances (see Marriage age in the United States). In England and Wales the general age at which a person may marry is 18, but 16- or 17-year-olds may get married with their parents' or guardians' consent. If they are unable to obtain this, they can gain consent from the courts, which may be granted by the Magistrates' Courts, or the County or High Court family divisions.

Gender restrictions 

Legal, social, and religious restrictions apply in all countries on the genders of the couple.

In response to changing social and political attitudes, some jurisdictions and religious denominations now recognize marriages between people of the same sex. Other jurisdictions have instead "civil unions" or "domestic partnerships", while additional others explicitly prohibit same-sex marriages.

In 1989, Denmark became the first country in the modern era to give same-sex couples the right to formalize their relation as a registered partnership. , twenty eight countries have come to recognize same-sex marriages for civil purposes, namely the Netherlands, Belgium, Spain, Canada, South Africa, Norway, Sweden, Portugal, Iceland, Argentina, Denmark, Brazil, France, Uruguay, New Zealand, United Kingdom, Luxembourg, Finland, Ireland, Malta, Costa Rica, Taiwan, Colombia and the United States. Denmark gave same-sex couples the right to marry in 2013, and this right extends to a right to get married in the Church of Denmark, although individual priests have the right to refuse to perform such marriages. On June 26, 2015, Supreme Court of the United States ruled that the ban on same-sex marriages were de jure unconstitutional, which de facto legalized the same-sex marriage process in the United States.

Europe 

To avoid the use of the term "marriage", some governments provide civil unions, which, depending on the jurisdiction, are open to same-sex couples only, opposite-sex couples only, or both same-sex and opposite-sex couples, to confer all or a portion of the benefits of married status. Civil unions (and registered/domestic partnerships) are currently recognized and accepted in approximately 30 out of 193 countries worldwide and in some U.S. states. In some countries where it has been adopted, applications for marriage licenses have far exceeded governmental estimates of demand. Some jurisdictions, such as the nations of Israel, Aruba, and the Netherlands Antilles, as well as the U.S. state of New Mexico recognize same-sex marriages lawfully entered into elsewhere, while not permitting them to be performed locally. In addition to civil authorities, some religious denominations ceremonially perform civil unions and same-sex marriages, and recognize them as essentially equivalent to other marriages. For example, Lutheran churches in Netherlands, New Zealand, Sweden and some Lutheran churches of the Evangelical Church in Germany allow blessing ceremonies for same-sex couples, as do Unitarian Universalist churches.

Further religious conflicts 

These developments have created a political and religious reaction in some countries, including in England, where the Church of England, after long debate, officially banned blessings of gay couples by Church of England clergy, and in the United States, which continues to experience conflicts, based upon religious grounds.

Kinship restrictions 

Kinship is two people that are related by blood or adoption, such as brother, sister, mother, father, aunt, uncle etc. No European country prohibits marriage between first cousins. The U.S. is the only western country with cousin marriage restrictions. Societies have often placed restrictions on marriage to relatives, though the degree of prohibited relationship varies widely. In most societies, marriage between brothers and sisters has been forbidden, with ancient Egyptian, Hawaiian, and Inca royalty being prominent exceptions. In many societies, marriage between first cousins is preferred, while at the other extreme, the medieval Catholic Church prohibited marriage even between distant cousins.

In the United Kingdom, the Deceased Wife's Sister's Marriage Act 1907 removed the previous prohibition for a man to marry the sister of his deceased wife. In Australia, marriage with an ancestor or descendant is prohibited, as is a marriage between a brother and a sister, whether of whole blood or half-blood and even if the brother or sister has been adopted.

All mainstream religions prohibit some marriages on the basis of the consanguinity (lineal descent) and affinity (kinship by marriage) of the prospective marriage partners, though the standards vary.

Social restrictions 

In the Indian Hindu community, especially in the Brahmin caste, marrying a person of the same gotra was prohibited, since persons belonging to the same gotra are said to have identical patrilineal descent. In ancient India, when gurukuls existed, the shishyas (pupils) were advised against marrying any of guru's children, as shishyas were also considered the guru's children and it would be considered marriage among siblings. However, there were exceptions, including Arjuna's son Abhimanyu's marriage to Uttra, the dance student of Arjuna in Mahabharata. The Hindu Marriage Act, 1955 brought reforms in the area of same-gotra marriages, which were banned prior to the act's passage. Now the Indian constitution allows any consenting adult heterosexual couple (women 18 or older and men 21 or older) from any race, religion, caste, or creed to marry.

Many societies have also adopted other restrictions on whom one can marry, such as prohibitions of marrying persons with the same surname, or persons with the same sacred animal. Anthropologists refer to these sorts of restrictions as exogamy. One example is South Korea's general taboo against a man marrying a woman with the same family name. The most common surname in South Korea is Kim (almost 20%); however, there are several branches (or clans) in the Kim surname. (Korean family names are divided into one or more clans.) Only intra-clan marriages are prohibited, as they are considered one type of endogamy. Thus, many "Kim-Kim" couples can be found. 

Societies have also at times required marriage from within a certain group. Anthropologists refer to these restrictions as endogamy. An example of such restrictions would be a requirement to marry someone from the same tribe. Racist laws adopted by some societies in the past—such as Nazi-era Germany, apartheid-era South Africa, and most of the United States in the nineteenth and the first half of the 20th century—and which prohibited marriage between persons of different races could also be considered examples of endogamy.

In modern Israel, the status of marriage is the same as it was historically under the Ottoman Empire and the British mandate, where civil marriage does not exist and authority for marriage is given by the state solely to the recognized religious denominations (Orthodox Judaism, Islam, Druze, and ten Christian denominations (primarily Orthodox Christianity and Catholicism, but also including the Episcopal Church).   Israeli couples who wish to contract a marriage that are not allowed under the auspices of any of these religious denominations (including same-sex marriages, marriages involving Israelis of Jewish descent who are not recognized by the state as Jewish and marriages between non-Jewish Arab citizens of Israel and Israeli Jews) or simply wish to get legally married outside the auspices of one of these institutions cannot do so in Israel itself. However, Israel does recognize civil marriages between Israeli citizens that are contracted abroad, including same-sex marriage, so couples in these situations will often hold a non-binding ceremony in Israel and fly abroad (often to nearby Cyprus) to contract a legal marriage that is then recognized in Israel.

In the U.S., many laws banning interracial marriage, which were state laws, were gradually repealed between 1948 and 1967. The U.S. Supreme Court declared all such laws unconstitutional in the case of Loving v. Virginia in 1967.

Polygamy 

Polygamy—being married to more than one spouse—is illegal in most countries. Where polygamous marriages are allowed, it is typically polygyny that is permitted. While accepted by some societies, it is far less common than monogamy.

Polygamy is normally not permitted in most western countries, although some recognize bona fide polygamous marriages that were performed in other countries. Polygamy is practiced illegally by some groups in the United States and Canada, primarily by certain Mormon fundamentalist sects that separated from the mainstream Latter Day Saints movement after the practice was renounced in 1890.

Many societies, even some with a cultural tradition of polygamy, recognize monogamy as the only valid form of marriage. For example, People's Republic of China shifted from allowing polygamy to supporting only monogamy in the Marriage Act of 1950 after the Communist revolution.

In Islam, polygamy is permitted by the Quran (4:3) which states "If you fear you might fail to give orphan women their ˹due˺ rights ˹if you were to marry them˺, then marry other women of your choice—two, three, or four. But if you are afraid you will fail to maintain justice (between your wives) then ˹content yourselves with˺ one or those ˹bondwomen˺(slaves) in your possession. This way you are less likely to commit injustice (to the orphan girls in your care)." [This verse is from a para which is setting out rules for adoption of orphans.] 

Africa has the highest rate of polygamy in the world. In India, only Muslims are allowed to practice polygamy.

Polygamy, taking the form of polygyny, is most common in a region known as the "polygamy belt" in West Africa and Central Africa, with the countries estimated to have the highest polygamy prevalence in the world being Burkina Faso, Mali, Gambia, Niger and Nigeria. In the region of sub-Saharan Africa, polygyny is common and deeply rooted in the culture, with 11% of the population of sub-Saharan Africa living in such marriages (25% of the Muslim population and 3% of the Christian population, as of 2019). Polygyny is especially widespread in West Africa, with the countries estimated to have the highest polygyny  prevalence in the world as of 2019 being Burkina Faso (36%), Mali (34%) and Gambia (30%). Outside of Africa, the highest prevalence is in Afghanistan, Yemen and Iraq.

Medical examination

Beginning in the early 20th century, a number of jurisdictions have mandated premarital medical testing or examinations for one or both parties. One of the most commonly mandated was a blood test for syphilis. Between the 1930s and 1950s, most US states passed laws requiring both parties to a marriage to undergo a Wassermann test (or equivalent) for syphilis. If one of the parties was found to have communicable syphilis, they would generally be prevented from marrying until they underwent treatment to resolve the infection. Before the availability of penicillin after World War II, the treatment of syphilis entailed a course of arsenic-based drugs for up to a year or more. These statutes were eventually repealed between the 1970s and 2000s, because they were considered to no longer be a cost-effective public health measure.

In the 1980s and 1990s, many US state legislatures considered laws requiring premarital HIV testing, though only a small number were adopted, and were only briefly active before being repealed. As of 2010, premarital HIV testing is legally mandated in Bahrain, certain provinces of China, Libya, Saudi Arabia, the United Arab Emirates, and Uzbekistan.

State recognition 

In many jurisdictions, a civil marriage may take place as part of the religious marriage ceremony, although they are theoretically distinct. In most American states, a wedding must be officiated by the justice of the peace in order for it to be recognized. However, priests, ministers, rabbis, and many other religious authorities can act as viable agents of the state. In some countries, such as France, Spain, Germany, Turkey, Argentina, Japan and Russia, it is necessary to be married by government authority separately from any religious ceremony, with the state ceremony being the legally binding one. In those cases, the marriage is usually legalized before the ceremony. Some jurisdictions allow civil marriages in circumstances which are notably not allowed by particular religions, such as same-sex marriages or civil unions.

In a few jurisdictions, a marriage relationship may also be created by the operation of the law alone, as in common-law marriage, sometimes called "marriage by habit and repute." However, the term "common-law marriage" has wider informal use,  and is commonly used to refer to cohabiting couples, regardless of any rights they may have. The institution of common-law marriage, in its original legal meaning, has been abolished in almost all jurisdictions that used to have it, and only survives in a few US states. In several jurisdictions, such as parts of Canada, while the law recognizes unmarried couples for various purposes, such relations are not common-law marriages within the original meaning of this legal concept. (see common-law marriage vs. cohabitation). The informal use of the term "common-law marriage" has given rise to many public misconceptions regarding this legal institution.

The status in the eyes of one authority may not be the same as for another. For example, a marriage may be recognised civilly, but not by a church, and vice versa. Normally a marriage entered into in one country will be recognised in other countries. Sometimes, however, a religious ceremony or a marriage entered into in one country is not recognized by another, such as a same-sex marriage.

International recognition 

Some countries give legal recognition to marriages performed in another country under the Hague Convention on Marriages (1978). For this to apply, both the country of marriage and the country where recognition is sought need to be members of this convention.

If the country of marriage is not a member of the Hague Convention on Marriages (1978), then the marriage documents will need to be certified following the Apostille convention. This certification is usually performed in the country of marriage by the embassy of the country whose recognition is sought.

License 
A marriage license is a document issued, either by a church or state authority, authorizing a couple to marry. The procedure for obtaining a license varies between jurisdictions and has changed over time.

Notice 

In many countries there is a requirement to give notice of an impending marriage to the community so that objections to the marriage can be raised. This custom was in place as a mechanism to necessitate the consent of parents as well as the wider community.

Formality 

While some countries, such as Australia, permit marriages to be held in private and at any location, others, including England, require that the civil ceremony be conducted in a place specially sanctioned by law (e.g., a church or register office), and be open to the public. An exception can be made in the case of marriage by special emergency license, which is normally granted only when one of the parties is terminally ill. Rules about where and when persons can marry vary from place to place. Some regulations require that one of the parties reside in the locality of the registry office.

Ending a marriage
A marriage can end when one partner dies, by divorce or by annulment. Divorce laws vary significantly by country. The only countries that do not allow divorce are the Philippines and the Vatican City, an ecclesiastical state, which has no procedure for divorce. Countries that have relatively recently legalized divorce are Italy (1970), Portugal (1975), Brazil (1977), Spain (1981), Argentina (1987), Paraguay (1991), Colombia (1991) Ireland (1996), Chile (2004) and Malta (2011).

See also 
 Family law
 Marriage
 Mesopotamian marriage law
 Prohibited degree of kinship
 Marriage Act 1961 of Australia

Notes

References

External links 

 Lord Hardwicke 1754 Marriage Act